Acrometopa macropoda is a species belonging to the family Tettigoniidae  subfamily Phaneropterinae. It is found in southern Europe approximately from Trieste on both sides of the Adriatic coast - Italy and Yugoslavia and to the south Greece and the Dinaric Mountains . It prefers dry grasslands and wastelands with loose bushes or higher-growing plants, such as thistles . Taxonomy- may be a
subspecies of Acrometopa servillea

References

Orthoptera of Europe
Phaneropterinae
Insects described in 1838